The Nobel Prize in Physics is awarded annually by the Royal Swedish Academy of Sciences to scientists in the various fields of physics. It is one of the five Nobel Prizes established by the 1895 will of Alfred Nobel (who died in 1896), awarded for outstanding contributions in physics. As dictated by Nobel's will, the award is administered by the Nobel Foundation and awarded by the Royal Swedish Academy of Sciences. The award is presented in Stockholm at an annual ceremony on 10 December, the anniversary of Nobel's death. Each recipient receives a medal, a diploma and a monetary award prize that has varied throughout the years.

Statistics 
The Nobel Prize in Physics has been awarded to 221 individuals until 2022. The first prize in physics was awarded in 1901 to Wilhelm Conrad Röntgen, of Germany, who received 150,782 SEK. John Bardeen is the only laureate to win the prize twice—in 1956 and 1972. Marie Skłodowska-Curie also won two Nobel Prizes, for physics in 1903 and chemistry in 1911.

William Lawrence Bragg was the youngest Nobel laureate in physics; he won the prize in 1915 at the age of 25. He was also the youngest laureate for any Nobel prize until 2014 (when Malala Yousafzai won the Nobel Peace Prize at age 17). The oldest Nobel Prize laureate in physics was Arthur Ashkin who was 96 years old when he was awarded the prize in 2018.

Only four women have won the prize: Curie, Maria Goeppert-Mayer (1963), Donna Strickland (2018), and Andrea Ghez (2020).

There have been six years for which the Nobel Prize in Physics was not awarded (1916, 1931, 1934, 1940–1942). There were also nine years for which the Nobel Prize in Physics was delayed for one year:

 The 1914 prize awarded to Max von Laue was announced only in November 1915.
 The Prize was not awarded in 1917, as the Nobel Committee for Physics decided that none of that year's nominations met the necessary criteria, but was awarded to Charles Glover Barkla in 1918 and counted as the 1917 prize.
 This precedent was followed for the 1918 prize awarded to Max Planck in 1919,
 the 1921 prize awarded to Albert Einstein in 1922,
 the 1924 prize awarded to Manne Siegbahn in 1925,
 the 1925 prize awarded to James Franck and Gustav Hertz in 1926,
 the 1928 prize awarded to Owen Richardson in 1929,
 the 1932 prize awarded to Werner Heisenberg in 1933, and
 the 1943 prize awarded to Otto Stern in 1944.

Ioannidis et al. reported that half of the Nobel Prize for science awarded between 1995 and 2017 are clustered in few disciplines. Particle physics (14%), atomic physics (10.9%), and 3 non-physics disciplines are dominating the prize in recent decades. And then semiconductor physics and magnetics are the next most honoured physics disciplines.

Laureates

See also 
 List of Nobel laureates
 List of Nobel laureates by country
 List of physicists

References

Notes 

A. The form and spelling of the names in the name column is according to nobelprize.org, the official website of the Nobel Foundation. Alternative spellings and name forms, where they exist, are given at the articles linked from this column. Where available, an image of each Nobel laureate is provided. For the official pictures provided by the Nobel Foundation, see the pages for each Nobel laureate at nobelprize.org.
B. The information in the country column is according to nobelprize.org, the official website of the Nobel Foundation. This information may not necessarily reflect the recipient's birthplace or citizenship.
C. The citation for each award is quoted (not always in full) from nobelprize.org, the official website of the Nobel Foundation. The links in this column are to articles (or sections of articles) on the history and areas of physics for which the awards were presented. The links are intended only as a guide and explanation. For a full account of the work done by each Nobel laureate, please see the biography articles linked from the name column.

Citations

Sources

External links 

 Official website of the Royal Swedish Academy of Sciences
 Official website of the Nobel Foundation

Physics